Kurzętnik  is a village in Nowe Miasto County, Warmian-Masurian Voivodeship, in northern Poland. It is the seat of the gmina (administrative district) called Gmina Kurzętnik.

The village has a population of 3,065.

References

Villages in Nowe Miasto County